This article lists the major power stations located in Hubei province.

Non-renewable

Coal, gas and fuel-oil-based

Nuclear

Renewable

Hydroelectric

Conventional

The dam was raised 14.6 meters to 111.6 meters in 2010. The installed six 150 MW turbines were increased their capacities accordingly.

Pumped-storage

See also

 :zh:湖北水库列表 - List of reservoirs in Hubei, on zh.wiki

References 

 
Hubei
Power stations